Umbrian is an extinct Italic language formerly spoken by the Umbri in the ancient Italian region of Umbria. Within the Italic languages it is closely related to the Oscan group and is therefore associated with it in the group of Osco-Umbrian languages, a term generally replaced by Sabellic in modern scholarship. Since that classification was first formulated, a number of other languages in ancient Italy were discovered to be more closely related to Umbrian. Therefore, a group, the Umbrian languages, was devised to contain them.

Corpus
Umbrian is known from about 30 inscriptions dated from the 7th through 1st centuries BC. The largest cache by far is the Iguvine Tablets, seven inscribed bronze tablets found in 1444  near the village of Scheggia or, according to another tradition, in an underground chamber at Gubbio (ancient Iguvium). The seven tablets contain notes on the ceremonies and statutes for priests of the ancient religion in the region. Sometimes they are called the Eugubian tablets after the medieval name of Iguvium/Eugubium. The tablets contain 4000–5000 words.

Other minor inscriptions are from Todi, Assisi and Spoleto.

Alphabet
The Iguvine tablets were written in two alphabets. The older, the Umbrian alphabet, like other Old Italic script, was derived from the Etruscan alphabet, and was written right-to-left, essentially equivalent to the Neo-Etruscan, but using letter shaped like a 'P' from the Archaic Etruscan alphabet for the unique Umbrian sound discussed below. The newer was written in the Latin script. The texts are sometimes called Old Umbrian and New Umbrian. The differences are mainly orthographic. For example, rs in the Latin alphabet is represented by a single character in the native script (generally transcribed as ř; this represents an unknown sound that developed regularly from intervocalic *-d- in most cases). To clearly distinguish them, the native script is generally transcribed in bold, the Latin in italics.

Grammar

Phonology
The exact phonetics of much of what follows are not completely clear.

Consonants
Voiceless plosives: p, t, k
Voiced plosives: b, d, g

Voiceless fricative: f, <ç>/<ś> (=/ʃ/?), h
Voiced fricatives: <ř>/<rs> (=/ʒ/?)

Nasals: m, n
Rhotic: r
Approximants: l, j, w

Vowels

Pure: i, e, a, o, u; ā, ē, ī, ō, ū

Diphthongs: ai, ei, ou

Nouns
Classes of nouns roughly match those in Latin: long a-stems matching Latin first declension, historical o-stems matching Latin second declension, consonant- and i-stems matching Latin third declension, with some more sparse attestation of u-stem (Latin fourth) and long e-stem (Latin fifth) declensions. 

There are seven attested cases in the singular: nominative, accusative (along with the nom-acc neuter case), genitive, dative, ablative, locative, and vocative. In the plural, there are only four distinct cases: nominative; accusative; genitive; and dative-and-ablative combined into one form. There are no attested locative or vocative plurals. 

Examples from long a-stems (for use of bold versus italic script, see above under "Alphabet"):
Singular: Nom. muta/mutu "fine" (related to Latin molta "fine"); Acc. tuta / totam "city, state"; Gen. tutas / totar (the later with rhotacism, on which see below) "of the city" (note that Umbrian continues the PIE case, while Latin innovates here to -ae); Dat. tute "to the city"; Abl. asa "from the altar"; Loc. tote "in the city"; Voc. Prestota "Oh, Prestota"
Plural: Nom. fameřias "families"; Acc. porca "pigs"; Gen. pracatarum "of the ramparts"?; Dat.-Abl. plenasier "for the annual festival" (with final rhotacism from -s; thought to be related to Latin plenus "full" with the semantic development > "of the full (year)").

Phonological history

Shared changes
Umbrian shares some phonological changes with its sister language Oscan.

Labialization of *kʷ to p
This change is shared with Umbrian, and so is a common Sabellic change, reminiscent of the k/p split between Goidellic (Irish, etc) and Cymric (Welsh, etc). piře, pirse "what"; Oscan pídum vs Latin quid.

Initial stress and syncope

At some point early in the history of all Indo-European Italic languages, the accent seems to have shifted to the initial syllable of words as a stress accent, since non-initial syllables are regularly lost or weakened. Since the same pattern occurs in the history of Etruscan, this must be assumed to be an areal feature. (By the time of classical Latin, the accent had shifted in that language to more of an Ancient Greek pattern--on the third syllable from the end (antepenult) unless the last syllable was long, in which case it fell on the second to last syllable (the penult).)  The degree to which these shifts can be connected to similar shifts to initial stress in Celtic and Germanic is unclear; for discussion see J. Salmons' Accentual Change and Language Contact. 

Examples: 
Loss of unstressed short -e-: *onse "shoulder" < *omesei, compare Latin umerus; destre "on the right" < *deksiterer; ostendu "present" (imperative) < *obs-tendetōd, compare Latin ostendito.

Innovations unique to Umbrian (or not shared with Oscan)
But compared to its highly conservative sister language Oscan, Umbrian exhibits a number of innovations, some of them shared by its neighbor to the west, Latin. (Below, following convention, bold text for Umbrian and Oscan indicates words written in the native, Etruscan derived script, while italics represents words written in Latin-derived script.)

Treatment of original diphthongs
All diphthongs are simplified (a process only partly seen in Latin, and only very rarely in Oscan). So Proto-Italic *ai and *ei become Umbrian low ē: kvestur : Oscan kvaísstur, Latin quaestor 'official in charge of public revenue and expenditure'; prever 'single' : Oscan preivatud, Latin prīvus; furthermore, Proto-Italic *oi, *ou and *au become ō (written u in the native script) in initial syllables: unu 'one' : Old Latin oinus; ute 'or' : Oscan auti, Latin aut; tuta 'city' : Oscan touto.

Palatalization of velars
Velars are palatalized and spirantized before front vowels and the front glide /j/ to probably a palatalized sibilant (perhaps the postalveolar /ʃ/), written ç, ś or simply s. (A similar change happened later in most Romance languages.) For example: Umbrian śesna 'dinner' : Oscan kersnu, Latin cēna; Umbrian façiu 'I do, I make' : Latin faciō.

Rhotacism
Like Latin, but unlike Oscan, intervocalic -s- rhotacized to -r- in Umbrian. In late forms of the language, final -s also becomes -r (a change not seen in Latin).  For example, the genitive plural ending of -ā stems: Umbrian -arum, Latin -arum vs Oscan -asúm  (compare Sanskrit -āsām).

Treatment of *d

While initial *d- is preserved (spelled t in the native alphabet), earlier intervocalic *-d- (and sometimes *-l-) show up in the native alphabet as a character generally transliterated as  ř, but as the sequence rs in Umbrian texts using the Latin alphabet. The exact pronunciation is unknown: piře, pirse "what" vs. Oscan pídum, Latin quid.

Sample texts

Taken from the Iguvine Tablets, tablet Va, lines 6–10 (written in the native alphabet on the tablet):

In Latin:

In English:

Taken from the Iguvine Tablets, tablet VIa, lines 25–31 (written in the Latin alphabet on the tablet):

In Latin:

In English:

References

Sources

Further reading
Buck, Carl Darling. 1979. A Grammar of Oscan and Umbrian: With a Collection of Inscriptions and a Glossary. Hildesheim: Olms.
————. 2001. A Vocabulary of Umbrian: Including the Umbrian Glosses. Bristol, PA: Evolution Publishing.
Clackson, James. 2015. "Subgrouping in the Sabellian Branch of Indo‐European." Transactions of the Philological Society 113 (1): 4–37.
Poultney, James. 1959. The bronze tables of Iguvium. Philological Monographs 18. Baltimore: American Philological Association.
Untermann, Jürgen. Wörterbuch des Oskisch-Umbrischen. Heidelberg, Germany: Universitätsverlag C. Winter, 2000.
Wallace, Rex E. “Sabellian Languages.” In The Cambridge Encyclopedia of Ancient Languages, ed.Roger D. Woodard, 812–839. Cambridge, U.K.: Cambridge University Press, 2004.
Weiss, Michael L. 2010. Language and Ritual In Sabellic Italy: The Ritual Complex of the Third and the Fourth Tabulae Iguvinae. Leiden: Brill.
 Whatmough, Joshua. "A New Umbrian Inscription of Assisi." Harvard Studies in Classical Philology 50 (1939): 89-93. Accessed May 5, 2020. doi:10.2307/310593.

External links

 
 — with details of the Umbrian language

Osco-Umbrian languages
Languages attested from the 7th century BC
Languages extinct in the 1st century BC
Umbri